The H&J Mall is a shopping mall in Karunagappally in Kollam Metropolitan Area, India. The mall is owned by the NRI business man  from the Karunagappally, Mr. Hameed Kunju. The Mall is standing on the centre of the bustling trading town Karunagappally. It is the second shopping mall in Kollam Metropolitan Area. H&J Mall was inaugurated by film actor Mammootty on 29 March 2015. The  10-story mall is one of the important shopping destinations in Karunagappally. It features a Carnival Cinemas theater, dining area, escalator and two lifts.

References

Shopping malls in Kollam
2015 establishments in Kerala
Shopping malls established in 2015
Tourist attractions in Kollam district